Thomas Bailey (born 15 August 1992) is an Australian professional baseball pitcher for the Perth Heat of the Australian Baseball League.

He played college baseball at Dakota State University and Wayland Baptist University.

Bailey was selected as a member of the Australian national baseball team at the 2017 World Baseball Classic.

References

External links

1992 births
Living people
2017 World Baseball Classic players
Australian expatriate baseball players in the United States
Baseball pitchers
Baseball people from Western Australia
Dakota State Trojans baseball players
Perth Heat players
Wayland Baptist Pioneers baseball players